Carroll Sockwell (1943–1992) was an American artist whose nonrepresentational drawings, paintings, and assemblages drew upon both classical modernist and minimalist traditions and showed an ability to integrate geometric with gestural abstraction. He was known for his ability to introduce nuances of color and emphasis in bare and simple pictorial themes.

Difficult to label, his work was seen as paradoxical: "elegant and anguished, somber and yet playful, rigorous yet free." Throughout his career, he faced challenges that were beyond his control and seemed, as one observer said, to be "an artist who by birth, temperament and timing started out carrying a heavy load." Nonetheless, he also seemed to be his own worst enemy, disregarding the necessity of earning a living and alienating those who tried to help him.

Early life and education
 
Carroll Sockwell was born on February 13, 1943, in Washington, D.C. and grew up in a household headed by his maternal grandmother. His mother worked as a maid and his father sometimes worked as a laborer and sometimes served in the armed forces. His grandmother was also a maid. In addition to these relatives, an aunt, an uncle, and four brothers also lived in the home. With his father infrequently present, his mother had charge of his upbringing until, in 1948, she began a 15-year period of hospitalization for schizophrenia. On her departure, his aunt became his caregiver.

Sockwell attended public schools in the District and, while still a pupil, was himself committed to the same psychiatric hospital as the one where his mother was a patient. With support from social workers, Sockwell became interested first in music, then in theater, and finally in painting as possible careers. In 1957, at the age of 14, he entered the Corcoran School of Art. The following year, he won a prize for a work he created there.

During the time he was hospitalized for psychiatric treatment at St. Elizabeth's, Sockwell met Elinor Ulman, a foundational figure in the field of art therapy. She became a mentor, introducing him to the principal D.C. art galleries and museums and encouraging his artistic ambitions. In 1959, at the age of 17, Sockwell left his family home. He moved to Manhattan where he found work at Bonwit Teller and met important abstract expressionist artists, such as Barnett Newman and Willem de Kooning, primarily by visiting bars that they frequented, such as the famous Cedar Bar. Failing to find a foothold in the New York art scene, he returned to Washington D.C. in 1963. Of that four-year period, he later said "I was almost the only black. It was hard to be accepted."

Back in Washington he lived hand to mouth for a time. In 1965 he began a three-year stint as curator in the city's non-profit African-American gallery, Barnett-Aden. In 1968 or soon after, Sockwell became acquainted with Walter Hopps, James Harithas, and Harry Lunn, each of whom began to influence, support, and sustain his work. Hopps was then director of the Washington Gallery of Modern Art which, in 1968, was absorbed by the Corcoran Gallery. Harithas was then director of that gallery and Harry Lunn had just opened a commercial gallery in Washington.

Career in art

In 1958, then aged 15, Sockwell was awarded a prize for his painting, "Bridge With the Sun." In 1966 he exhibited in a group show held at the Tarot Gallery in Manhattan. Two years later his work appeared beside works by Michael Clark, Robert Newman, and Kenneth Wade in an exhibition of hard-edge art at the Corcoran Gallery. He showed the following year in an NAACP-sponsored group exhibition held at the Nordness Gallery in Manhattan. Other exhibitors included Norman Lewis, Charles McGee, Felrath Hines, Alma W. Thomas, Walter Williams. At the same time his work appeared in a group of seventeen artists at the Ringling Museum in Sarasota and at about this time he showed at the Margaret Dickey Gallery in the District. In 1971 a solo exhibition at the Jefferson Place Gallery called "Mirror Compositions" drew favorable criticism in both the Washington Post and Jet magazine. Another solo, this at the Corcoran, followed in 1974 and in the same year his work appeared in group shows at the Whitney and Brooklyn Museums. That year he also executed a commission for a 40-foot-long mural for the psychiatric ward of D.C. General Hospital. He subsequently showed in Washington commercial spaces, including the Middendorf, Fraser, and Fiedler galleries. 
 
 
Sockwell continued to show during the rest of the 1980s and first two years of the 1990s, but toward the end of this time he suffered periods when despite the assurance of high-priced sales he was unable to work and in the months leading up to his death in July 1992 he squandered the comfortable living that had been provided for him and returned to the destitute state of his early years as an artist.

On July 9, 1992, Sockwell committed suicide by jumping off the Pennsylvania Avenue Bridge in Washington's Foggy Bottom. Writing just before that event, a Washington critic wrote that despite Sockwell's reputation for being somewhat difficult—""rather excessively endowed with what is known as 'artistic temperament'"—his work was widely shown and enthusiastically received by both gallery goers and collectors. Afterwards Washington Post writer, Gene Weingarten, wrote a lengthy appreciation of his work and explication of his complex temperament and background.

On June 4, 1992, a solo exhibition of Sockwell's work opened at the Washington Project for the Arts. One critic said it was  "one of its worthiest and most compelling shows." Another said that although "everyone praises his art," many people in the local art scene were exasperated with Sockwell. He drank too much, alienated the owners of commercial galleries that showed him, refused to promote his work, would not meet with collectors who were interested in buying, and seemed constitutionally unable to hold down a job. One acquaintance said that Sockwell refused to engage in the business side of art, saying "Carroll thinks being an artist is enough." Another said he did not paint as a career, but because he had to, "like a raw nerve."

In the years following Sockwell's death, his work sporadically appeared in commercial galleries and museum exhibitions. Among the most significant of these was a retrospective in February 1999 at Case Western Reserve University's Mather Gallery curated by Sockwell friend and mentor James Hilleary.

Style and influences

Sockwell's work was nonrepresentational, integrating both geometric and gestural abstraction. Critics saw paradoxes in it, perceiving elements both rigorous and free. One said he achieved an equipoise between the "feral" and the "tame." A colleague said his "greatest strength lies in his ability to hold polar opposites and contradictions in his mind and resolve them visually in his art."

Most critics saw in Sockwell's work the influence of his troubled life. They found his style difficult to label. One critic saw in it a unique "synthesis of classical modernism and minimalism."  An acquaintance, when asked to pick a phrase to describe Sockwell's art, came up with "classicism in despair."

Sockwell worked mostly on paper. He used graphite, charcoal, pastel, watercolor, gouache, and acrylic. Grays, blacks, and whites dominate much of his work. Most of his output was two-dimensional, but he also made mixed-media wall constructions. He made a few large works and many small ones.

The untitled work of about 1965, shown upper left, is an example of Sockwell's handling of gouache in grays and blacks on paper. The untitled work of 1973, shown upper right, is an example of his handling of watercolor and acrylic in multiple colors on paper. The untitled work of 1988, shown lower left, is an example of Sockwell's handling of India ink with subtle use of colored pencil on paper. The work called "Legend 3," shown lower right, is an example of Sockwell's handling of mixed media on paper.

Reviewing the exhibition that opened just before Sockwell's death, Washington Post critic, Michael Welzenbach, summarized his art as "the invention of beauty and movement for their own sakes, a series of interconnected riffs revolving around a steady chord progression, and a tempo that seems never to falter."

Personal life and family

The Sockwell family lived in a house on Virginia Avenue at a location in Foggy Bottom where the Watergate Hotel now stands. It consisted of Sockwell's maternal grandmother, Sarah Wilson, along with an aunt, Edna Johnson, and her husband, Lonnie Johnson. Sockwell's parents were Luther and Annie Sockwell, and his siblings, all of them older brothers, were Edward (twelve years his senior), Paul (eight years), Luther (six years), and Eugene (five years). His mother was born in South Carolina in about 1912; his father in North Carolina in about 1903. A few years before his birth, the household's women earned their livings as domestic servants in private homes. Lonnie was then a dishwasher in a restaurant and Luther a laborer in a cemetery.

Sockwell's father was an alcoholic and reportedly had two other families. His mother suffered a schizophrenic breakdown in 1948 and spent 15 years in St. Elizabeths Hospital. Sockwell's aunt, Edna Johnson, took care of him and his brothers with reluctance. One of them told a reporter that she drove them out of the house, one by one.

At various times Sockwell was a patient at St. Elizabeths and in the psychiatric ward of D.C. General Hospital. He was both gay and African-American. He did not leave a suicide note and did not indicate to anyone that he was thinking about ending his life.

Notes

References

1943 births
1992 deaths
Artists from Washington, D.C.
Abstract painters
20th-century American painters
African-American painters
LGBT African Americans
Corcoran School of the Arts and Design alumni
Suicides by jumping in the United States
Suicides in Washington, D.C.
American gay artists